The following lists events that happened during 2013 in Chile.

Incumbents
 President: Sebastián Piñera (RN)

Events

January 
 January 19 – The 2013 Dakar Rally ends in Santiago.

February
 February 9 – Tomé Tragedy

December
December 15 – In the runoff after the 2013 general election, Socialist candidate Michelle Bachelet is elected.

References

 
Years of the 21st century in Chile
2010s in Chile
Chile
Chile